Secure Hypertext Transfer Protocol (S-HTTP) is an obsolete alternative to the HTTPS protocol for encrypting web communications carried over the Internet.

Even though S-HTTP was first to market, Netscape's dominance of the browser market led to HTTPS becoming the de facto method for securing web communications.

Comparison to HTTP over TLS
S-HTTP encrypts only the served page data and submitted data like POST fields, leaving the initiation of the protocol unchanged. Because of this, S-HTTP could be used concurrently with HTTP (unsecured) on the same port, as the unencrypted header would determine whether the rest of the transmission is encrypted.

In contrast, HTTP over TLS wraps the entire communication within Transport Layer Security (TLS; formerly SSL), so the encryption starts before any protocol data is sent. This creates a name-based virtual hosting "chicken and egg" issue with determining which DNS name was intended for the request.

This means that HTTPS implementations without Server Name Indication (SNI) support require a separate IP address per DNS name, and all HTTPS implementations require a separate port (usually 443 vs. HTTP's standard 80) for unambiguous use of encryption (treated in most browsers as a separate URI scheme, https://).

As documented in RFC 2817, HTTP can also be secured by implementing HTTP/1.1 Upgrade headers and upgrading to TLS. Running HTTP over TLS negotiated in this way does not have the implications of HTTPS with regards to name-based virtual hosting (no extra IP addresses, ports, or URI space). However, few implementations support this method.

In S-HTTP, the desired URL is not transmitted in the cleartext headers, but left blank; another set of headers is present inside the encrypted payload. In HTTP over TLS, all headers are inside the encrypted payload and the server application does not generally have the opportunity to gracefully recover from TLS fatal errors (including 'client certificate is untrusted' and 'client certificate is expired').

References

External links
RFC 2660 The Secure HyperText Transfer Protocol

Hypertext Transfer Protocol
Cryptographic protocols